Crow Creek is a  long 3rd order tributary to the Uwharrie River in Montgomery County, North Carolina.

Course
Crow Creek rises on the Laniers Creek divide in Randolph County about 1 mile west of New Hope, North Carolina.  Crow Creek then flows southeast into Montgomery County to join the Uwharrie River about 0.75 miles northeast of Coggins Mine.

Watershed
Crow Creek drains  of area, receives about 47.4 in/year of precipitation, has a wetness index of 377.59 and is about 65% forested.

See also
List of rivers of North Carolina

References

Rivers of North Carolina
Rivers of Montgomery County, North Carolina
Rivers of Randolph County, North Carolina